Karakat Lok Sabha constituency is one of the 40 Lok Sabha (parliamentary) constituencies in Bihar state in eastern India. This constituency came into existence in 2008 as a part of the implementation of delimitation of parliamentary constituencies based on the recommendations of the Delimitation Commission of India constituted in 2002.

Assembly segments
Presently, Karakat Lok Sabha constituency comprises six Vidhan Sabha (legislative assembly) segments. These are:

Members of Parliament

Source:

Election results

See also
 Rohtas district
 List of Constituencies of the Lok Sabha
 Maudihan

References

External links
Karakat lok sabha  constituency election 2019 result details

Lok Sabha constituencies in Bihar
Politics of Rohtas district
Politics of Aurangabad district, Bihar
Dehri